The 2021–22 Bangladesh Cricket League or Bangabandhu Bangladesh Cricket League (BCL) 2021-22 was the ninth edition of the Bangladesh Cricket League (BCL), a first-class cricket competition that was held in Bangladesh from 12 December 2021 to 6 January 2022. In March 2021, Bangladesh Cricket Board (BCB) announced the domestic cricket schedule from 2021 to 2023 and confirmed that the 9th BCL would be held in December 2021. South Zone were the defending champions. The tournament was followed by the 2021–22 Bangladesh Cricket League One Day.

Points table

Fixtures

Round 1

Round 2

Round 3

Final

See also 

 2021–22 National Cricket League
 2021–22 Bangladesh Premier League

References

External links
 Series home at ESPN Cricinfo

Bangladesh Cricket League
Domestic cricket competitions in 2021–22
2021 in Bangladeshi cricket
Bangladeshi cricket seasons from 2000–01